Łódź, also seen without diacritics as Lodz, is a city in central Poland and a former industrial centre. The city's coat of arms is an example of canting, as it depicts a boat ( in Polish), which alludes to the city's name.  Łódź has a population of 670,642 making it the country's fourth largest city.

Łódź was once a small settlement that first appeared in 14th-century records. It was granted town rights in 1423 by Polish King Władysław II Jagiełło and it remained a private town of the Kuyavian bishops and clergy until the late 18th century. In the Second Partition of Poland in 1793, Łódź was annexed to Prussia before becoming part of the Napoleonic Duchy of Warsaw; the city joined Congress Poland, a Russian client state, at the 1815 Congress of Vienna. The Second Industrial Revolution (from 1870) brought rapid growth in textile manufacturing and in population owing to the inflow of migrants, notably Germans and Jews. Ever since the industrialization of the area, the city has been multinational and struggled with social inequalities, as documented in the novel The Promised Land by Nobel Prize–winning author Władysław Reymont. The contrasts greatly reflected on the architecture of the city, where luxurious mansions coexisted with red-brick factories and dilapidated tenement houses.

The industrial development and demographic surge made Łódź one of the largest cities in Poland. Under the German occupation during World War II Łódź was briefly renamed  after Karl Litzmann. The city's population was persecuted and its large Jewish minority was forced into a walled zone known as the Łódź Ghetto, from where they were sent to German concentration and extermination camps. The city became Poland's temporary seat of power in 1945.

Łódź experienced a sharp demographic and economic decline after 1989. It was only in the 2010s that the city began to experience revitalization of its neglected downtown area. Łódź is ranked by the Globalization and World Cities Research Network on the “Sufficiency” level of global influence and is internationally known for its National Film School, a cradle for the most renowned Polish actors and directors, including Andrzej Wajda and Roman Polanski. In 2017, the city was inducted into the UNESCO Creative Cities Network and named UNESCO City of Film.

Name and toponymy
The Polish name for the city, directly translates to 'boat' in the English language. There is no unanimous consensus on its precise origin, but popular theories link it with the medieval village of Lodzia and the now-canalised River Łódka on which the modern city was founded. It may have also derived from the term  denoting a willow tree and the personal Old Polish name Włodzisław.

History

Early beginnings (1332–1815)

Łódź first appears in a 1332 written record issued by Władysław the Hunchback, Duke of Łęczyca, which transferred the village of Lodzia to the Bishopric of Włocławek. The document enumerated the privileges of its inhabitants, notably the right to graze land, establish pastures and engage in logging. In 1423, King of Poland Władysław II Jagiełło officially granted town rights to the village under Magdeburg Law. For centuries, it remained a small remote settlement situated among woodlands and marshes, which was privately held by the Kuyavian bishops. The economy was predominantly driven by agriculture and farming until the 19th century. The earliest two versions of the coat of arms appeared on seal emblems in 1535 and 1577, with the latter illustrating a boat-like vessel and a turned oar.

With the Second Partition of Poland in 1793, Łódź was annexed by Prussia. In 1798, the Kuyavian bishops' ownership over the region was formally revoked during the secularisation of church property. The town, governed by a burgomaster, at the time had only 190 residents, 44 occupied dwellings, a church and a prison. In 1806, Łódź was incorporated into the Napoleonic Duchy of Warsaw. In the aftermath of the 1815 Congress of Vienna, the duchy was dissolved and the town became part of the Congress Kingdom of Poland, a client state of the Russian Empire.

Partitions and development (1815–1918)

In 1820, the government of the Congress Kingdom designated Łódź and its rural surroundings for centrally planned industrial development. Rajmund Rembieliński, head of the Administrative Council and prefect of Masovia, became the president of a commission that subdivided the works two major phases; the first (1821–23) comprised the creation of a new city centre with an octagonal square (contemporary ; Liberty Square) and arranged housing allotments on greenfield land situated south of the old marketplace; the second stage (1824–28) involved the establishment of cotton mill colonies and a linear street system along with an arterial north-south thoroughfare, Piotrkowska. Many of the early dwellings were timber cottages built for housing weavers.

During this time, a sizeable number of German craftsmen settled in the city, encouraged by exemptions from tax obligations. Their settlement in Poland was encouraged by renowned philosopher and statesman Stanisław Staszic, who acted as the director of the Department of Trade, Crafts and Industry.

In 1851, the Imperial authorities abolished a customs barrier which was imposed on Congress Poland following the failed November Uprising (1830–1831). The suppression of tariffs allowed the city to freely export its goods to Russia, where the demand for textiles was high. Poland's first steam-powered loom commenced operations at Ludwik Geyer's White Factory in 1839. During the first weeks of the January Uprising (1863–1864), a unit of 300 Polish insurgents entered the city without resistance and seized weapons, and later on, there were also clashes between Polish insurgents and Russian troops in the city. In 1864, the inhabitants of adjacent villages were permitted to settle in Łódź without restrictions. The development of railways in the region was also instrumental in expanding the textile industry; in 1865 the Łódź–Koluszki line, a branch of the Warsaw–Vienna railway, was opened, thus providing a train connection to larger markets. In 1867, the city was incorporated into the Piotrków Governorate, a local province.

The infrastructure and edifices of Łódź were built at the expense of industrialists and business magnates, chiefly Karl Wilhelm Scheibler and Izrael Poznański, who sponsored schools, hospitals, orphanages, and places of worship. From 1872 to 1892, Poznański established a major textile manufactory composed of twelve factories, power plants, worker tenements, a private fire station, and a large eclectic palace. By the end of the century, Scheibler's  became one of Europe's largest industrial complexes, employing 5,000 workers within a single facility. The years 1870–1890 saw the most intense industrialisation, which was marked by social inequalities and dire working conditions. Łódź soon became a notable centre of the socialist movement and the so-called Łódź rebellion(pl) in May 1892 was quelled by a military intervention.

The turn of the 20th century coincided with cultural and technological progress; in 1899, the first stationary cinema in Poland was opened in Łódź. In the same year, Józef Piłsudski, the future Marshal of Poland, settled in the city and began printing the Robotnik (The Worker; p. 1894–1939), an underground newspaper published by the Polish Socialist Party. During the June Days (1905), approximately 100,000 unemployed labourers went on a mass strike, barricaded the streets and clashed with troops. Officially, 151 demonstrators were killed and thousands were wounded.

In the aftermath of the Battle of Łódź (1914), the city came under Imperial German occupation on 6 December. With Polish independence restored in November 1918, the local population disarmed the German army. Subsequently, the textile industry of Łódź stalled and its population briefly decreased as ethnic Germans left the city.

Restored Poland (1918–1939)

Despite its large population and economic output, Łódź did not serve as the seat of its province until the 20th century. Following the establishment of the Second Polish Republic, it became the capital of the Łódź Voivodeship in 1919. The early interwar period was characterised by considerable economic hardship and industrial stagnation. The Great Depression and the German–Polish customs war closed western markets to Polish textiles while the Bolshevik Revolution and the Civil War in Russia put an end to the most profitable trade with the East.

Because of rapid and, consequently, chaotic development in the previous century, Łódź did not possess the adequate infrastructure and living standards for its inhabitants. Pollution was acute, sanitary conditions were poor and the authorities did not invest in a sewage treatment system until the 1920s. From 1918 to 1939, many cultural, educational and scientific institutions were created, including elementary schools, museums, art galleries and public libraries which prior to the First World War did not exist. Łódź also began developing an entertainment scene, with 34 movie theatres opened by 1939. On 13 September 1925, the city's first airport, Lublinek, commenced operations. In 1930, the first radio transmission from a newly-founded broadcasting station took place.

The ideological orientation of Łódź was strongly left-wing and the city was a notable centre of socialist, communist and bundist activity in Polish politics during the interbellum.

Second World War (1939–1945)

During the invasion of Poland in September 1939, the Polish forces of General Juliusz Rómmel's Army Łódź defended the city against the German assault by forming a line of resistance between Sieradz and Piotrków Trybunalski. The attack was perpetrated by the 8th Army of Johannes Blaskowitz, who encircled the city with the X Army Corps. After fierce resistance, a Polish delegation surrendered to the Nazis on 8 September, and the first  troops entered in the early hours of 9 September. The German  paramilitary death squad entered the city on 12 September. Arthur Greiser incorporated Łódź into a new administrative subdivision of Nazi Germany called  on 9 November 1939, and on 11 April 1940 the city was renamed to  after German general and NSDAP member Karl Litzmann.

The city became subjected to immediate Germanisation, with Polish and Jewish establishments closed, and Polish-language press banned. Low-wage forced labour was imposed on the city's inhabitants aged 16 to 60; many were subsequently deported to Germany. Polish children were forcibly taken from their parents, and from 1942 to 1945 the German Sicherheitspolizei operated a camp for kidnapped Polish children from various regions in Łódź.

The Nazi authorities established the Łódź Ghetto in the city and populated it with more than 200,000 Jews from the region, who were systematically sent to German extermination camps. It was the second-largest ghetto in occupied Europe, and the last major ghetto to be liquidated, in August 1944. The Polish resistance movement operated in the city and aided the Jewish people throughout its existence. However, only 877 Jews were still alive by 1945. Of the 223,000 Jews in Łódź before the invasion, 10,000 survived the Holocaust in other places. The Germans also created camps for non-Jews, including the Romani people deported from abroad, who were ultimately murdered at Chełmno, as well as a penal forced labour camp, four transit camps for Poles expelled from the city and region, and a racial research camp.

Contemporary times (1945–present)
 
Following the end of the Second World War, Łódź informally and temporarily took over the functions of Poland's capital, and most of the government and country administration resided in the city prior to Warsaw's reconstruction. Łódź also experienced an influx of refugees from eastern territories annexed by the Soviet Union; many migrated into its suburbs and occupied empty – formerly Jewish – properties. Under the Polish People's Republic, the city's industry and private companies were nationalised. On 24 May 1945, the University of Łódź was inaugurated. On 8 March 1948, the National Film School was opened, later becoming Poland's primary academy of drama and cinema.

Post-war spatial and urban planning was conducted in accordance with the Athens Charter, where the population from the old core was relocated into new residential zones. However, as a result, the inner-city and historical areas fell in significance and degenerated into a slum. A number of extensive panel block housing estates (including Retkinia, Teofilów, Widzew, Radogoszcz and Chojny) were constructed between 1960 and 1990, covering an area of almost  and accommodating a large part of the populace.

In mid-1981 Łódź became famous for its massive hunger demonstration of local mothers and their children. After the period of economic transition during the 1990s, most enterprises were again privatised.

Geography 
The city lies in the lowlands of the Central European Plain, not exceeding 300 metres in elevation. Topographically, the Łódź region is generally characterised by a flat landscape, with only several highlands which do not exceed 50 metres above the terrain level. The soil is predominantly sandy (62%) followed by clay (24%), silt (8%), and organogenic formations (6%) from regional wetlands. The forest cover (equivalent to 4.2% of the whole country) is considerably low compared to other cities, regions, and provinces of Poland.

Climate 
Łódź has a humid continental climate (Dfb in the Köppen climate classification).

Districts
Łódź was previously subdivided into five boroughs: Bałuty, Widzew, Śródmieście, Polesie, Górna.

However, the city is now divided into 36  ('districts'): Bałuty-Centrum, Bałuty-Doły, Bałuty Zachodnie, Julianów-Marysin-Rogi, Łagiewniki, Radogoszcz, Teofilów-Wielkopolska, Osiedle Wzniesień Łódzkich, Chojny, Chojny-Dąbrowa, Górniak, Nad Nerem, Piastów-Kurak, Rokicie, Ruda, Wiskitno, Osiedle im. Józefa Montwiłła-Mireckiego, Karolew-Retkinia Wschód, Koziny, Lublinek-Pienista, Retkinia Zachód-Smulsko, Stare Polesie, Zdrowie-Mania, Złotno, Śródmieście-Wschód, Osiedle Katedralna, Andrzejów, Dolina Łódki, Mileszki, Nowosolna, Olechów-Janów, Stary Widzew, Stoki, Widzew-Wschód, Zarzew, and Osiedle nr 33.

Demographics

According to Statistics Poland (GUS), Łódź was inhabited by 672,185 people and had a population density of 2,292 persons per square kilometre (5,940/sq mi),  Approximately 55.7 percent of inhabitants are of working age (18–64 years), which is a considerable decrease from 64.1 percent in 2010. An estimated 29.1 percent is of post-working age compared to 21.8 percent ten years earlier.  In 2020, 54.39 percent (365,500) of all residents were women. Łódź has one of the highest feminisation rates among Poland's major cities, a legacy of the city's industrial past, when the textile factories attracted large numbers of female employees.

At its peak in 1988 the population was around 854,000, however, the it has since declined due to low fertility rates, outward migration and a lower life expectancy than in other parts of Poland. Łódź was the country's second largest city until 2007, when it lost its position to Kraków. A major contributing factor was the abrupt transition from socialist to market-based economy after 1989 and the resulting economic crisis, but the economic growth which followed has not reversed the trend. Depopulation and ageing are a major impediments for the future development of the city, putting strain on social infrastructure and medical services.

Historically, Łódź was multi-ethnic and its diverse population comprised migrants from other regions of Europe. In 1839, approximately 78 percent (6,648) of the total population was German. In 1913, Łódź had a population of 506,100 people, of whom 251,700 (49.7%) were Poles, 171,900 (34%) were Jews, 75,000 (14.8%) were Germans, and 6,300 (1.3%) were Russians. According to the 1931 Polish census, the total population of 604,000 included 375,000 (59%) Poles, 192,000 (32%) Jews and 54,000 (9%) Germans. By 1939, the Jewish minority had grown to well over 200,000.

Places of interest

This makes it one of the longest commercial streets in the world. Most of the building façades, many of which date back to the 19th century, have been renovated. It is the site of most restaurants, bars and cafes in Łódź's city centre.

Many neglected tenement houses throughout the entire city centre have been renovated in recent years as part of the ongoing revitalization project run by the local authorities. The best example of urban regeneration in Łódź is the Manufaktura complex, occupying a large area of a former cotton factory dating back to the nineteenth century. The site, which was the heart of Izrael Poznański's industrial empire, now hosts a shopping mall, numerous restaurants, 4-star hotel, multiplex cinema, factory museum, bowling and fitness facilities and a science exhibition centre. Opened in 2006, it quickly became a centre of cultural entertainment and shopping, as well as a recognizable city landmark attracting both domestic and foreign tourists. The city is also likely to receive a large boost in terms of tourism once the massive revitalization project of the city's downtown (worth 4 billion PLN) is completed. The local government's efforts to transform the former industrial city into a thriving urban environment and tourist destination formed the basis for the city's failed bid to organise the 2022 International EXPO exhibition on the subject of urban renewal.

Łódź has one of the best museums of modern art in Poland.  has three branches, two of which (ms1 and ms2) display collections of 20th and 21st-century art. The newest addition to the museum, ms2 was opened in 2008 in the Manufaktura complex. The unique collection of the Museum is presented in an unconventional way: instead of a chronological lecture on the development of art, works of art representing various periods and movements are arranged into a story touching themes and motifs important for the contemporary public.

Among the 14 registered museums to be found in Łódź, there is the independent Book Art Museum, awarded the American Printing History Association's Institutional Award for 2015 for its outstanding contribution to the study, recording, preservation, and dissemination of printing history in Poland over the last 35 years. Other notable museums include the Central Museum of Textiles with its open-air display of wooden architecture, the Cinematography Museum, located in Scheibler Palace, and the Museum of Independence Traditions, occupying the building of a historical Tsarist prison from the late 19th century. A more unusual establishment, the  museum offers tourists a chance to visit the municipal sewer designed in the early years of the 20th century by the British engineer William Heerlein Lindley.

Łódź also provides plenty of green spaces for recreation. Woodland areas cover 9.61% of the city, with parks taking up an additional 2.37% of the area of Łódź (  ('Łagiewnicki Forest'), the largest forest within city limits, is referred to in scholarship as "the largest forested area within the administrative borders of any city in Europe." It has an area of 1,245 ha and is cut across by a number of hiking trails that traverse the hilly landscape on the western edge of Łódź Hills Landscape Park. A "natural complex which has remained nearly intact as oak-hornbeam and oak woodland," the forest is also rich in history, and its attractions include a Franciscan friary dating back to the early 18th century and two 17th-century wooden chapels. Out of a total of 44 parks in Łódź ( 11 have historical status, the oldest of them dating back to the middle of the 19th century. The largest of these, Józef Piłsudski Park, is located near the Łódź Zoo and the city's botanical garden, and together with them it comprises an extensive green complex known as  serving the recreational needs of the city. Another notable park located in Łódź is the Józef Poniatowski Park.

The Jewish Cemetery at Bracka Street, one of the largest of its kind in Europe, was established in 1892. After the invasion of Poland by Nazi Germany in 1939, this cemetery became a part of Łódź's eastern territory known as the enclosed Łódź ghetto (Ghetto Field). Between 1940 and 1944, approximately 43,000 burials took place within the grounds of this rounded-up cemetery. In 1956, a monument by Muszko in memory of the victims of the Łódź Ghetto was erected at the cemetery. It contains approximately 180,000 graves, approximately 65,000 labelled tombstones, ohels and mausoleums. Many of these monuments have significant architectural value; 100 of these have been declared historical monuments and have been in various stages of restoration. The mausoleum of Izrael and Eleanora Poznański is perhaps the largest Jewish tombstone in the world and the only one decorated with mosaics.

Economy and infrastructure

Before 1990, the economy of Łódź was heavily reliant on the textile industry, which had developed in the city in the nineteenth century owing to the abundance of rivers used to power the industry's fulling mills, bleaching plants and other machinery. Because of the growth in this industry, the city has sometimes been called the "Polish Manchester" and the "lingerie capital of Poland". As a result, Łódź grew from a population of 13,000 in 1840 to over 500,000 in 1913. By the time right before World War I Łódź had become one of the most densely populated industrial cities in the world, with 13,280 inhabitants per km2, and also one of the most polluted. The textile industry declined dramatically in 1990 and 1991, and no major textile company survives in Łódź today. However, countless small companies still provide a significant output of textiles, mostly for export. Łódź is no longer a significant industrial centre, but it has become a major hub for the business services sector in Poland owing to the availability of highly skilled workers and active cooperation between local universities and the business sector.

The city benefits from its central location in Poland. A number of firms have located their logistics centres in the vicinity. Two motorways, A1 spanning from the north to the south of Poland, and A2 going from the east to the west, intersect northeast of the city.  the A2 is complete to Warsaw and the northern section of A1 is largely completed. With these connections, the advantages of the city's central location should increase even further. Work has also begun on upgrading the railway connection with Warsaw, which reduced the 2-hour travel time to make the  journey 1.5 hours in 2009.  travel time from Łódź to Warsaw is around 1.2 hours with the modern Pesa SA Dart trains.

Recent years have seen many foreign companies opening and establishing their offices in Łódź. The Indian IT company Infosys has one of its centres in the city. In January 2009 Dell announced that it will shift production from its plant in Limerick, Ireland to its plant in Łódź, largely because the labour costs in Poland are a fraction of those in Ireland. The city's investor friendly policies have attracted 980 foreign investors by January 2009. Foreign investment was one of the factors which decreased the unemployment rate in Łódź to 6.5 percent in December 2008, from 20 percent four years earlier.

Transport

Łódź is situated near the geographical centre of Poland, only a short distance away from the motorway junction in Stryków where the two main north–south (A1) and east–west (A2) Polish transport corridors meet, which positions the city on two of the ten major trans-European routes: from Gdańsk to Žilina and Brno and from Berlin to Moscow via Warsaw. It is also part of the New Silk Road, a regular cargo rail connection with the Chinese city of Chengdu operating since 2013. Łódź is served by the national motorway network, an international airport, and long-distance and regional railways. It is at the centre of a regional and commuter rail network operating from the city's various train stations. Bus and tram services are operated by a municipal public transport company.

Major roads include:
 A1: Gdańsk – Toruń – Łódź – Częstochowa – Cieszyn (national border)
 A2: Świecko (national border) – Poznań – Łódź – Warszawa
 S8: Wrocław – Sieradz – Łódź – Piotrków Trybunalski – Warszawa – Białystok
 S14: Pabianice – Konstantynów Łódzki – Aleksandrów Łódzki – Zgierz
 DK14: Łowicz – Stryków – Łódź – Zduńska Wola – Sieradz – Złoczew – Walichnowy
 DK72: Konin – Turek – Poddębice – Łódź – Brzeziny – Rawa Mazowiecka
 DK91: Gdańsk – Tczew – Toruń – Łódź – Piotrków Trybunalski – Radomsko – Częstochowa

Airport

Flights connect the city with destinations in Europe including Turkey. In 2014 the airport handled 253,772 passengers. It is the 8th largest airport in Poland.

Public Transport

The Municipal Transport Company – Łódź (Miejskie Przedsiębiorstwo Komunikacyjne – Łódź), owned by the Łódź City Government, is responsible for operating 58 bus routes and 19 tram lines.

Rail
Łódź has a number of long distance and local railway stations. There are two main stations in the city, but with no direct rail connection between them—a legacy of 19th-century railway network planning. Originally constructed in 1866, the centrally-located Łódź Fabryczna was a terminus station for a branch line of the Warsaw-Vienna railway, whereas Łódź Kaliska was built more than thirty years later on the central section of the Warsaw-Kalisz railway. For this reason most intercity train traffic goes to this day through Łódź Kaliska station, despite its relative distance from the city centre, and Łódź Fabryczna serves mainly as a terminal station for trains to Warsaw. The situation will be remedied in 2021 after the construction of a tunnel connecting the two, which is likely to make Łódź Poland's main railway hub. The tunnel will additionally serve Łódź Commuter Railway, providing a rapid transit system for the city, dubbed the Łódź Metro by the media and local authorities. Two new stations are to be constructed on the underground line, one serving the needs of the Manufaktura complex and the other located in the area of Piotrkowska Street.

In December 2016, a few years after the demolition of the old building of  station, a new underground station was opened. It is considered to be the largest and most modern of all train stations in Poland and is designed to handle increased traffic after the construction of the tunnel. It also serves as a multimodal transport hub, featuring an underground intercity bus station, and is integrated with a new transport interchange serving taxis and local trams and buses. The construction of the new Łódź Fabryczna station was part of a broader project of urban renewal known as Nowe Centrum Łodzi (New Centre of Łódź).

The third-largest train station in Łódź is Łódź Widzew. There are also many other stations and train stops in the city, many of which were upgraded as part of the Łódzka Kolej Aglomeracyjna commuter rail project. The rail service, founded as part of a major regional rail upgrade and owned by Łódź Voivodeship, operates on routes to Kutno, Sieradz, Skierniewice, Łowicz, and on selected days to Warsaw, with plans for further expansion after the construction of the tunnel.

Education

Łódź is a thriving center of academic life. Currently Łódź hosts three major state-owned universities, six higher education establishments operating for more than a half of the century, and a number of smaller schools of higher education. The tertiary institutions with the most students in Łódź include:

University of Łódź (UŁ – )
Lodz University of Technology (PŁ – )
Medical University of Łódź
National Film School in Łódź
Academy of Music in Łódź
Academy of Fine Arts In Łódź

In the 2018 general ranking of state-owned tertiary education institutions in Poland, the University of Łódź came 20th (6th place among universities) and Lodz University of Technology 12th (6th place among technical universities). The Medical University of Łódź was ranked 5th among Polish medical universities. Leading courses taught in Łódź include administration (3rd place), law (4th) and biology (4th).

There is also a number of private-owned institutions of higher learning in Łódź. The largest of these are the University of Social Sciences and the University of Humanities and Economics in Łódź. In the 2018 ranking of private universities in Poland the former was ranked 9th, and the latter 23rd.

National Film School in Łódź

The Leon Schiller National Higher School of Film, Television and Theatre in Łódź is the most notable academy for future actors, directors, photographers, camera operators and TV staff in Poland. It was founded on 8 March 1948 and was initially planned to be moved to Warsaw as soon as the city was rebuilt following the Warsaw Uprising. However, in the end the school remained in Łódź and today is one of the best-known institutions of higher education in the city.

At the end of the Second World War Łódź remained the only large Polish city besides Kraków which war had not destroyed. The creation of the National Film School gave Łódź a role of greater importance from a cultural viewpoint, which before the war had belonged exclusively to Warsaw and Kraków. Early students of the School include the directors Andrzej Munk, Roman Polanski, Andrzej Wajda, Kazimierz Karabasz (one of the founders of the so-called Black Series of Polish Documentary) and Janusz Morgenstern, who at the end of the 1950s became famous as one of the founders of the Polish Film School of Cinematography.

Culture

Museums in Łódź
 Archaeological and Ethnographical Museum
 Book Art Museum
 Central Museum of Textiles
 City of Lodz History Museum
 Film Museum
 Herbst Palace Museum
 Muzeum Sztuki (Museum of Art)
 Natural History Museum, University of Łódź
 Muzeum Tradycji Niepodległościowych (Independence Traditions Museum) with three parts:
 Radegast train station
 Mausoleum and museum in Radogoszcz – Radogoszcz prison
 exhibition Kuźnia Romów (Roma forge) in former Łódź Ghetto
 Se-ma-for museum of stop-motion film animation
 The Centre for Science and Technology EC1 in former Łódź power plant

Łódź in literature and cinema
Three major novels depict the development of industrial Łódź: Władysław Reymont's The Promised Land (1898), Joseph Roth's Hotel Savoy (1924) and Israel Joshua Singer's The Brothers Ashkenazi (1937). Roth's novel depicts the city on the eve of a workers' riot in 1919. Reymont's novel was made into a film by Andrzej Wajda in 1975. In the 1990 film Europa Europa, Solomon Perel's family flees pre-World War II Berlin and settles in Łódź. Paweł Pawlikowski's film Ida was partially shot in Łódź. Łódź. Chava Rosenfarb’s Yiddish trilogy “The Tree of Life” (1972; English translation 1985) portrays life within the Łódź Ghetto.

Sport 

The city has experience as a host for international sporting events such as the 2009 EuroBasket, the 2011 EuroBasket Women, the 2014 FIVB Volleyball Men's World Championship and the 2019 FIFA U-20 World Cup, with the opening and final of the latter taking place at Stadion Widzewa. Łódź will also host the sixth edition of the European Universities Games in 2022.

Under communism it was common for clubs to participate in many different sports for all ages and sexes. Many of these traditional clubs still survive today. Originally they were owned directly by a public body, but now they are independently operated by clubs or private companies. However they get public support through the cheap rent of land and other subsidies from the city. Some of their sections have gone professional and separated from the clubs as private companies. For example, Budowlani S.A is a private company that owns the only professional rugby team in Łódź, while Klub Sportowy Budowlani remains a community amateur club.
 Budowlani Łódź – rugby (six times Polish champions), hockey, wrestling, volleyball
 ŁKS Łódź – association football (two times Polish champions), basketball (Polish champions 1953), volleyball (two times Polish champions), handball, boxing
 SMS Łódź – association football, volleyball, basketball
 KS Społem Łódź – road and track cycling
 SKS Start Łódź – football, swimming
 Widzew Łódź – association football (four time Polish champions, semi-finalists of the 1982–83 European Cup)
 Orzeł Łódź - motorcycle speedway team

Horticultural Expo 2029
Łódź bid for the Specialized Expo 2022/2023 but lost out to Buenos Aires, Argentina.

Łódź was planned to host the Horticultural Expo in 2024.  However, multiple Expo events were delayed due to the COVID-19 pandemic, a Horticultural Expo in Doha,  Qatar from 2021/22 to 23/24 among them. As a result, the Horticultural Expo in Łódź has been rescheduled to 2029 to maintain a required time interval between them.

Notable residents

Daniel Amit (1938–2007), Israeli physicist
Yehuda Ashlag (1885–1954), also known as the Baal Ha-Sulam, Rabbi
Grażyna Bacewicz (1909–1969), composer
Aleksander Bardini (1913–1995), theatre director and actor
Andrzej Bartkowiak (born 1950), cameraman and film director
Jurek Becker (1937–1997), writer
Sylwester Bednarek (born 1989), high jumper
Marek Belka (born 1952), politician, former Prime Minister, Finance Minister of Poland, member European Parliament
Karolina Bielawska (born 1999), model and Miss World 2021
Kazimierz Brandys (1916–2000), writer
Artur Brauner (1918–2019), film producer
Edward Gustave Brisch (1901–1960), industrial coding and classification expert. He was the designer of the Brisch Classification, widely known and used in building and engineering.
Jacob Bronowski (1908–1974), writer, mathematician, and Britain's leading academic TV figure of the 1970s.
Sabina Citron (born 1928), Holocaust survivor, activist, and author
Bat-Sheva Dagan (born 1925), Holocaust survivor, teacher, psychologist, author
Karl Dedecius (1921–2016), translator
Elizabeth Diller (born 1954), American architect
Karl Dominik (born 1980), China's first Chinese speaking Polish actor
Marek Edelman (1919/1922–2009), Holocaust survivor, one of the leaders of the Warsaw Ghetto Uprising, Solidarity activist, Polish politician, human rights activist
Jacob Eisner (born 1947), Israeli basketball player
Max Factor Sr. (1877–1938), businessman, founder of the Max Factor cosmetics company
Dov Freiberg (1927–2008), Holocaust survivor and writer
Magdalena Fręch (born 1997), tennis player 
Joseph Friedenson (1922–2013), Holocaust survivor and writer
Piotr Fronczewski (born 1946), Polish actor
 Maciej Golubiewski (born 1976), Polish political scientist and diplomat, Consul General at the Consulate General of the Republic of Poland in New York City
Marcin Gortat (born 1984), NBA basketball player for the Washington Wizards
Mendel Grossman (1913–1945), Łódź ghetto photographer 
Józef Hecht (1891–1951), engraver and printmaker 
Jerzy Janowicz (born 1990), tennis player
Josef Joffe (born 1944), journalist
Michał Kalecki (1899–1970), Marxian economist, "one of the most distinguished economists of the 20th century"
Roman Kantor (1912–1943), épée fencer, Nordic champion and Soviet champion; killed by the Nazis
Jan Karski (1914–2000), diplomat and anti-nazi resistant
Aharon Katzir (1914–1972), Israeli pioneer in study of electrochemistry of biopolymers; killed in Lod Airport Massacre
Lea Koenig (born 1929), Israeli actress
Paul Klecki (1900–1973), conductor
Katarzyna Kobro (1898–1951), sculptor
Tomasz Konieczny (born 1972), opera singer
Jerzy Kosinski (1933–1991), writer
Jan Kowalewski (1892–1965), cryptologist who broke Soviet military codes, and ciphers during the Polish-Soviet War
Karolina Kowalkiewicz (born 1985), UFC Strawweight Title challenger
Feliks W. Kres (born 1966), fantasy writer
Anna Lewandowska (born 1988), karateka and nutrition expert
Nathan Lewin, Washington, D.C. attorney
Daniel Libeskind (born 1946), architect
Tadeusz Miciński (1873–1918), poet
Stanisław Mikulski (1929–2014), actor
Ruth Minsky Sender (born 1926), author and survivor
Zew Wawa Morejno (1916–2011), Chief Rabbi
Henry Morgentaler (1923–2013), physician 
Konstantin Petrovich Nechaev (1883–1946), White movement leader and mercenary commander in China
Zbigniew Nienacki (1929–1994), writer
Marek Olędzki (born 1951), archaeologist
Marian P. Opala (1921–2010), Oklahoma Supreme Court Justice
Adam Ostrowski (born 1980), better known as O.S.T.R., rapper
Adam Palma (born 1974), Polish-British guitarist and teacher
Władysław Pasikowski (born 1959), film director
Roman Polanski (born 1933), cinema director, Oscar and Golden Palm winner
Piotr Pustelnik (born 1951), alpine and high-altitude climber, the 20th man to climb all 14 eight-thousanders.
Ze'ev Raban (1890–1970), Israeli painter and sculptor
Adolph Moses Radin (1848–1909), rabbi
Damian Radowicz (born 1989), footballer
Władysław Reymont (1867–1925), writer, Nobel Prize winner
Joseph Rotblat (1908–2005), physicist, Nobel Prize winner
Stefan Rozental (1903–1994), nuclear physicist
Artur Rubinstein (1887–1982), pianist
Arnold Rutkowski, opera singer
Zbigniew Rybczyński (born 1949), animator and Oscar winner
Marek Saganowski (born 1978), football player
Andrzej Sapkowski (born 1948), fantasy writer
Carl Wilhelm Scheibler (1820–1881), one of the most important Łódź industrialists
Euzebiusz Smolarek (born 1981), football player
Piotr Sobociński (1958–2001), cinematographer
Andrzej Sontag (born 1952), track-and-field athlete
Natan Spigel (1900–1942), painter
Władysław Strzemiński (1893–1952), painter, Katarzyna Kobro's husband
Borys Szyc (born 1978), actor and musician
Arthur Szyk (1894–1951), artist
Adam Szymczyk (born 1970), art critic and curator
Aleksander Tansman (1897–1986), composer and pianist
Jack Tramiel (1928–2012), computer manufacturer, the founder of Commodore
Julian Tuwim (1894–1953), poet
Andrzej Udalski (born 1957), astronomer and astrophysicist
Miś Uszatek, cartoon character
Michał Wiśniewski (born 1972), singer
Paweł Zatorski (born 1990), volleyball player, double World Champion
Hanna Zdanowska (born 1959), politician, Mayor of Łódź
Aleksandra Ziółkowska-Boehm (born 1949), writer

International relations

Łódź is home to nine foreign consulates, all of which are Honorary. They are subordinate to the following states' main representation in Poland: French, Danish, German, Austrian, British, Belgian, Latvian, Hungarian and Moldavian.

Twin towns – sister cities
Łódź is twinned with:

 Chemnitz in Germany (since 1972)
 Stuttgart in Germany (since 1988)
 Lyon in France (since 1991)
 Vilnius in Lithuania (since 1991)
 Odesa in Ukraine (since 1993)
 Tel Aviv in Israel (since 1994)
 Rustavi in Georgia (since 1995)
 Barreiro in Portugal (since 1996)
 Tampere in Finland (since 1996)
 Puebla in Mexico (since 1996)
 Murcia in Spain (since 1999)
 Örebro in Sweden (since 2001)
 Lviv in Ukraine (since 2003)
 Denizli in Turkey (since 2005)
 Szeged in Hungary (since 2008)
 Guangzhou in People's Republic of China (since 2014)
 Chengdu in People's Republic of China (since 2015)

Łódź belongs also to the Eurocities network.

After the Russian invasion of Ukraine, Łódź terminated the partnership with Russian cities Ivanovo and Kaliningrad, and with Minsk, the capital of Belarus on 2 March 2022.

See also

 History of Łódź
 Łódź Design Festival
 International Festival of Comics and Games in Łódź

Explanatory notes

References

Inline citations

Bibliography

 Alan Adelson and Robert Lapides, Łódź Ghetto : A Community History Told in Diaries, Journals, and Documents, Viking, 1989. 
 "A Stairwell in Lodz," Constance Cappel, 2004, Xlibris, (in English).
 
 "Lodz – The Last Ghetto in Poland," Michal Unger, Yad Vashem, 600 pages (in Hebrew)
 Stefański, Krzysztof (2000). Gmachy użyteczności publicznej dawnej Łodzi, Łódź 2000 .
 Stefański, Krzysztof (2009). Ludzie którzy zbudowali Łódź Leksykon architektów i budowniczych miasta (do 1939 roku), Łódź 2009 .

External links

 
 Public Transport Official Site
 City map of Łódź
 Historic images of Łódź
 Łódź Special Economic Zone
 Łódź-Lublinek Airport 
 
  —English language newspaper
 The Łódź Ghetto 
 

 
Cities and towns in Łódź Voivodeship
City counties of Poland
Holocaust locations in Poland
Łódź Voivodeship (1919–1939)
Magdeburg rights
Piotrków Governorate
Jewish communities destroyed in the Holocaust